Romeo Vucic (born 30 January 2003) is an Austrian professional footballer who plays as a striker for Austria Wien.

Career
Vucic is a youth product of Rapid Wien before joining the youth academy of Austria Wien in 2014. He was promoted to their reserves and eventually senior team in 2021. He signed his first professional contract with Austria Wien on 3 July 2021. He signed his first professional contract with the club on 22 March 2022. He made his senior debut with Austria Wien in a 0–0 Austrian Football Bundesliga tie with Austria Klagenfurt on 21 November 2021.

International career
Vucic is a youth international for Austria, having represented the Austria U15s and the U16s.

Personal life 
Vucic's father, Novak, is a Bosnian-born football director in Austria.

References

External links
 
 OEFB Profile

2003 births
Living people
Footballers from Vienna
Austrian footballers
Austria youth international footballers
Austrian people of Bosnia and Herzegovina descent
FK Austria Wien players
Austrian Football Bundesliga players
2. Liga (Austria) players
Association football forwards